Raj Arjun is an Indian actor who mainly works in Hindi cinema. He has also worked in Malayalam, Tamil and Telugu cinema.  He is the recipient of Zee Cine Awards for  Best Actor In A Negative Role and Indian Television Academy Awards for Best Actor.

Early and personal life
Raj Arjun was born on 8 February in Bhopal, Madhya Pradesh. He was associated with theatre in Bhopal for multiple years.  He is married to Sanya. His daughter Sara Arjun is also an actress.

Career

Hindi cinema
Arjun made his debut in Hindi Film Industry with the film Black Friday. He got recognition in industry with the film Secret Superstar. He has also acted in films like Thalaivii and Love Hostel.

Tamil
He made his debut in Tamil Film Industry with the film Thaandavam.

Telugu
He made his debut in Telugu Film Industry with the film Dear Comrade.

Filmography

Films

Short film

Webseries

Awards and nominations

References

External links
 

Living people
21st-century Indian male actors
Indian male film actors
Male actors in Hindi cinema
Male actors in Tamil cinema
1980 births
Zee Cine Awards winners